is a railway station on the Toyama Chihō Railway Main Line in the city of Kurobe, Toyama, Japan, operated by the private railway operator Toyama Chihō Railway.

Services

Under the timetable effective from the opening of the station in February 2015, 66 trains on the Toyama Chihō Railway Main Line including limited express services stop at the station to serve an estimated 870 passengers per day. All shinkansen services at Kurobe-Unazukionsen Station connect with trains at Shin-Kurobe Station.

Layout

The station has a wheelchair-accessible  side platform serving a single bi-directional track.

Adjacent stations

History
Construction of the station began on November 7, 2013.

The station opened on February 26, 2015, ahead of the opening of adjacent Kurobe-Unazukionsen Station on the Hokuriku Shinkansen.

Surrounding area

 Kurobe-Unazukionsen Station (on the Hokuriku Shinkansen)

See also
 List of railway stations in Japan

References

External links

 

Railway stations in Toyama Prefecture
Railway stations in Japan opened in 2015
Stations of Toyama Chihō Railway
Kurobe, Toyama